Noëlle Châtelet; born 16 October 1944 as Noëlle Jospin) is a French writer and lecturer at the Paris Descartes University in the humanities. She is the author of essays, collections of short stories and novels translated into several languages.

Life and career 
Noëlle Châtelet obtained her PhD at Paris 8 University with thesis in sociology titled 'The Culinary Melee: Images and Institutions' about psychosocial and cultural aspects of eating disorders in young women.

She was director of the French Institute of Florence, Italy, from 1989 to 1991, and since 2003 is the vice-president of the Society of Men of Letters of France.

She also participated as an actress in numerous works for television and film until 1987.

She is the widow of the philosopher François Châtelet. She is the sister of Lionel Jospin.

Honors
2009: Chevalier of the Legion of Honour
1987: Prix Goncourt de la Nouvelle, Histoires de bouche

Bibliography 
 Non-fiction
 The Culinary Melee
 Stories of mouths, Mercure de France, 1986/Gallimard Folio, 1988. The new Prix Goncourt in 1987.
 A Contre-sens, 1989
 A table, 1992
 Le Baiser d'Isabelle, 2007

 Fiction
Price of the young writer in 1995.
 The Short scale, Gallimard, 1991. Folio, 1993.
 The Lady in Blue, Folio, 1997. Price Anna de Noailles, the French Academy.
 La Femme Coquelicot, 1997
 Le Petite aux tournesols, 1998
 La Tête en bas, 2002, Adaptation of the novel and staged a performance of contemporary mime by Compagnie Vahram Zaryan,2013
 La Dernière Leçon, 2004 – adapted into the 2015 film The Final Lesson
 Au pays des vermeilles, 2009

External links 
 Page on Noëlle Châtelet on SACD site

People from Meudon
1944 births
Living people
20th-century French novelists
21st-century French novelists
Prix Goncourt de la nouvelle recipients
Chevaliers of the Légion d'honneur
21st-century French women writers
20th-century French women writers
Prix Renaudot des lycéens winners